Michael Clark ( 1937 – 6 March 2015) was an English professional rugby league footballer who played in the 1950s and 1960s, and coached in the 1960s and 1970s.

Playing career

Huddersfield
After starting his rugby league career with Dewsbury, Clark was signed by Huddersfield in February 1961 in exchange for Keith Balmforth. He played for Huddersfield against Wakefield Trinity in the 1962 Challenge Cup Final at Wembley. In September 1962, Clark and team-mate David Flint were transferred to Salford in exchange for Bob Preece and a fee of £2,500.

Leeds
In September 1963, Clark joined Leeds from Salford for a fee of £2,000.

Clark played  in Leeds' 2–18 defeat by Wakefield Trinity in the 1964 Yorkshire Cup Final during the 1964–65 season at Fartown Ground, Huddersfield on Saturday 31 October 1964.

Clark played  and was captain in Leeds' 11–10 victory over Wakefield Trinity in the 1968 Challenge Cup "Watersplash" final during the 1967–68 season at Wembley Stadium, London on Saturday 11 May 1968. 

Clark played , and was captain in Leeds' 11–10 victory over Castleford in the 1968 Yorkshire Cup Final during the 1968–69 season at Belle Vue, Wakefield on Saturday 19 October 1968.

Clark played his last match for Leeds in October 1969, joining Keighley for a fee of £1,500.

Representative honours
Clark won caps for Yorkshire while at Leeds against Cumberland at Wheldon Road, Castleford, and against Lancashire at Naughton Park, Widnes.

Clark won caps for, and was captain of, Great Britain while at Leeds in 1968 against France (2 matches), and in the 1968 Rugby League World Cup against Australia, France, and New Zealand.

Coaching career
In 1970, Clark was appointed as coach at Keighley. He resigned in March 1972.

References

External links
Challenge Cup-winning Leeds captain Mick Clark dies aged 78
Leeds Rhinos: Former Leeds captain Clark dies
Rugby Cup Final 1968

1930s births
2015 deaths
Deaths from Parkinson's disease
Neurological disease deaths in England
Dewsbury Rams players
English rugby league coaches
English rugby league players
Great Britain national rugby league team players
Huddersfield Giants players
Keighley Cougars coaches
Keighley Cougars players
Leeds Rhinos captains
Leeds Rhinos players
Place of death missing
Rugby league players from Leeds
Rugby league props
Rugby league second-rows
Salford Red Devils players
Yorkshire rugby league team players